PaLM (Pathways Language Model) is a 540 billion parameter transformer-based large language model developed by Google AI. Researchers also trained smaller versions of PaLM, 8 and 62 billion parameter models, to test the effects of model scale.

PaLM is capable of a wide range of tasks, including commonsense reasoning, arithmetic reasoning, joke explanation, code generation, and translation. When combined with chain-of-thought prompting, PaLM achieved significantly better performance on datasets requiring reasoning of multiple steps, such as word problems and logic-based questions.

The model was first announced in April 2022 and remained private until March 2023, when Google launched an API for PaLM and several other technologies. The API will first be available to a limited number of developers who join a waitlist before being opened to the public.

Google and DeepMind developed a version of PaLM 540B called Med-PaLM that is fine-tuned on medical data and outperforms previous models on medical question answering benchmarks. Med-PaLM was the first to obtain a passing score on U.S. medical licensing questions, and in addition to answering both multiple choice and open-ended questions accurately, it also provides reasoning and is able to evaluate its own responses.

Google also extended PaLM using a ViT to create PaLM-E, a state-of-the-art vision-language model that can be used for robotic manipulation. The model can perform tasks in robotics competitively without the need for retraining or fine-tuning.

Training 
PaLM is pre-trained on high-quality corpus of 780 billion tokens that comprise various natural language tasks and use cases. This dataset includes filtered webpages, books, Wikipedia articles, news articles, source code obtained from open source repositories on GitHub, and social media conversations. It is based on the dataset used to train Google's LaMDA model. The social media conversation portion of the dataset makes up 50% of the corpus, which aids the model in its conversational capabilities.

PaLM 540B was trained over two TPU v4 Pods with 3,072 TPU v4 chips in each Pod attached to 768 hosts, connected using a combination of model and data parallelism, which is the largest TPU configuration described to date. This allowed for efficient training at scale using 6,144 chips, which marked a record of highest training efficiency achieved for LLMs at this scale of 57.8% hardware FLOPs utilization.

See also 
Large language model
LaMDA

References 

Computer-related introductions in 2022
Google software
Large language models